STS-46 was a NASA Space Shuttle mission using  and was launched on July 31, 1992, and landed on August 8, 1992.

Crew

Backup crew

Crew seating arrangements

Mission highlights 
The mission's primary objectives were the deployment of the European Space Agency's European Retrievable Carrier (EURECA) and the joint NASA/ASI (Italian Space Agency) Tethered Satellite System (TSS-1). EURECA was deployed a day later than scheduled because of a problem with its data handling system. However, thruster firing was cut to six minutes from twenty-four minutes because of unexpected attitude data from the spacecraft. The problem was resolved, and EURECA was successfully boosted to its operational orbit on the mission's sixth day. TSS-1 deployment also was delayed one day because of the problems with EURECA. During deployment, the satellite reached a maximum distance of only  from the orbiter instead of the planned  because of a jammed tether line. After numerous attempts over several days to free the tether, TSS-1 operations were curtailed, and the satellite was stowed for return to Earth. It would be reflown in 1996 on STS-75, with astronauts Allen, Hoffman, Nicollier and Chang-Díaz also flying again on that mission.

Secondary payloads included the Evaluation of Oxygen Integration with Materials/Thermal Management Processes (EOIM-III/TEMP 2A), Consortium for Materials Development in Space Complex Autonomous Payload (CONCAP II and CONCAP III), IMAX Cargo Bay Camera (ICBC), Limited Duration Space Environment Candidate Materials Exposure (LDCE), Pituitary Growth Hormone Cell Function (PHCF), and the Ultraviolet Plume Instrument (UVPI). The mission was extended by a day in order to complete scientific objectives.

Gallery

See also 

 STS-75, a space shuttle mission with objectives similar to those of STS-46
 List of human spaceflights
 List of Space Shuttle missions
 Outline of space science
 Space Shuttle

References

External links 
 NASA mission summary 
 STS-46 Video Highlights 

Space Shuttle missions
Spacecraft launched in 1992